The prime minister of Northern Ireland was the head of the Government of Northern Ireland between 1921 and 1972. No such office was provided for in the Government of Ireland Act 1920; however, the Lord Lieutenant of Ireland, as with governors-general in other Westminster Systems such as in Canada, chose to appoint someone to head the executive even though no such post existed in statute law. The office-holder assumed the title prime minister to draw parallels with the prime minister of the United Kingdom. On the advice of the new prime minister, the lord lieutenant then created the Department of the Prime Minister. The office of Prime Minister of Northern Ireland was suspended in 1972 and then abolished in 1973, along with the contemporary government, when direct rule of Northern Ireland was transferred to London.

The Government of Ireland Act provided for the appointment of the executive committee of the Privy Council of Northern Ireland by the governor. No parliamentary vote was required. Nor, theoretically, was the executive committee and its prime minister responsible to  the House of Commons of Northern Ireland. In reality the governor chose the leader of the party with a majority in the House to form a government. On each occasion this was the leader of the Ulster Unionist Party; such was the UUP's electoral dominance using both a simple plurality and for the first two elections, a proportional electoral system. All prime ministers of Northern Ireland were members of the Orange Order.

The prime minister's residence from 1920 until 1922 was Cabin Hill, later to become the junior school for Campbell College. After 1922 Stormont Castle was used, though some prime ministers chose to live in Stormont House, the unused residence of the Speaker of the House of Commons of Northern Ireland.

The new offices of first minister and deputy first minister were created by the Good Friday Agreement of 1998. In contrast with the Westminster-style system of the earlier Stormont government, the new Northern Ireland Executive operates on the principles of consociational democracy.

In 1974, Brian Faulkner was chosen to lead the Northern Ireland Executive not as Prime Minister of Northern Ireland but as Chief Executive of Northern Ireland.

List of office-holders

Parliamentary Secretary, Department of the Prime Minister 
1921–1929 The 12th Viscount Massereene
1929–1930 The 6th Viscount Bangor
1930–1941 Senator John Andrew Long
1941–1948 Sir Joseph Davison
1948–1960 Senator William Moore Wallis Clark
1960–1970 Senator Daniel McGladdery
1970–1972 Captain John Brooke, M.P.

Additional Parliamentary Secretary, Department of the Prime Minister 
1969 Bob Simpson

Footnotes

Sources
Alan J. Ward, The Irish Constitutional Tradition (Irish Academic Press, 1994)
Government of Ireland Act, 1920
The Government of Northern Ireland

Executive Committee of the Privy Council of Northern Ireland